Gary Baker (born August 8, 1952, in Niagara Falls, New York) is an American country music singer and songwriter.

Career

In the late 1970s, Baker was a musician with the LeBlanc and Carr Band. Baker was also a singer musician with the country-pop band, The Shooters. He has written songs for John Michael Montgomery, Alabama and others. Baker has been writing with his songwriting partner, Frank J. Myers since 1988, both having played in Marie Osmond's band. Baker and Myers' most successful song as songwriters is "I Swear", recorded by both All 4-One and John Michael Montgomery. The song sold more than 20 million copies internationally, and won the 1995 Grammy for "Best Country Song". In 1995, he and Myers recorded one album on Curb Records as the duo Baker & Myers.

He also wrote the hit "I'm Already There" for Lonestar.It spent six weeks at the top of the Billboard Hot Country Singles & Tracks chart. The song was the band's seventh Number One.

Personal life

Baker lives in Sheffield, Alabama with his wife and his three sons, Shane, Ryan, Brett, and Cole and daughter Ashley.

Baker's granddaughter, Cadence, auditioned for season 20 of American Idol and made it to Hollywood then on to Hawaii week and was eliminated during the Top 20.

See also
Baker & Myers

References

External links

Gary Baker Interview NAMM Oral History Library (2017)

American country singer-songwriters
Record producers from New York (state)
Living people
Musicians from Niagara Falls, New York
1952 births
Singer-songwriters from New York (state)
Country musicians from New York (state)